Gołaszewo  is a village in the administrative district of Gmina Kowal, within Włocławek County, Kuyavian-Pomeranian Voivodeship, in north-central Poland.

The village has an approximate population of 370.

References

Villages in Włocławek County